John Blundell may refer to:

 John Blundell (actor), British actor
 John Blundell (economist) (1952–2014), British economist and Director-General of the Institute of Economic Affairs